Madre Mia is a poem by William Hope Hodgson.  It is presented as the dedication to his novel The Boats of the "Glen Carrig".

Script 
People may say thou art no longer young
And yet, to me, thy youth was yesterday,
A yesterday that seems
Still mingled with my dreams.
Ah! how the years have o'er thee flung
Their soft mantilla, grey.

And e'en to them thou art not over old;
How could'st thou be! Thy hair
Hast scarcely lost its deep old glorious dark:
Thy face is scarcely lined. No mark
Destroys its calm serenity. Like gold
Of evening light, when winds scarce stir,
The soul-light of thy face is pure as prayer.

Poetry by William Hope Hodgson